The Fire Detective is a 1929 American adventure film serial directed by Spencer Gordon Bennet and Thomas Storey. The film is considered to be lost.

Cast
 Gladys McConnell as Gladys Samuels
 Hugh Allan as Capt. Jeff Tarrant
 Leo D. Maloney as Chief Carson
 Frank Lackteen as Mr. Tarrant
 John Cossar as Dist. Atty. Samuels
 Larry Steers as Charles Lewis
 Bruce Gordon

Chapter titles
 The Arson Trail
 The Pit of Darkness 
 The Hidden Hand 
 The Convict Strikes 
 On Flaming Waters 
 The Man of Mystery 
 The Ape Man 
 Back from Death 
 Menace of the Past 
 The Flame of Love

See also
 List of film serials
 List of film serials by studio

References

External links

1929 films
1929 adventure films
American silent serial films
American black-and-white films
American adventure films
Pathé Exchange film serials
Films directed by Spencer Gordon Bennet
Lost American films
1929 lost films
Lost adventure films
1920s American films
Silent adventure films